Lok Heng is a small town in Kota Tinggi District, Johor, Malaysia. It is located between Bandar Mas and Waha.

References

Kota Tinggi District
Towns in Johor